Abhimanyu Ravindra Pal Singh Chauhan (born 29 July 1985 in Bhilai, Chhattisgarh, India) is an Chhattisgarh local cricketer who played for Chhattisgarh in domestic cricket. He is a right-handed middle-order batsman and right-arm medium-fast bowler.

Personal life
Abhminayu Ravindra Pal Singh Chauhan lives in Bhilai with his parents after retiring from Cricket.

References

External links

1986 births
Living people
Indian cricketers
Baroda cricketers
People from Bhilai
Chhattisgarh cricketers
Cricketers from Chhattisgarh